Abdelmonem Bin Eisa Alserkal is an Emirati businessman and founder of Alserkal, Alserkal Avenue, Alserkal Arts Foundation and Alserkal Advisory.

Early years and education
Alserkal was born and raised in the United Arab Emirates. His grandfather was involved in setting up Dubai State Telephone Company Limited, the UAE's first telecommunication firm. As a child, Alserkal encountered art during his father's collection of books on Islamic art and Western masterpieces.

After graduating from a university in the United States, he began his career in real estate development in the UAE.

Career
A patron of the arts, he is the founder of Alserkal, and Alserkal Avenue, an arts district and established cultural hub housed in a former industrial district in the Al Quoz area of Dubai. Launched in 2008, Alserkal Avenue is home a to mix of art galleries, restaurants, performance venues, and co-working spaces. Alserkal initiated an expansion of Alserkal Avenue in early 2015. In addition to more gallery space, the expansion added a black box theatre, independent cinema, and outdoor performance venue.

In March 2017 Abdelmonem inaugurated Concrete (Alserkal Avenue), a multipurpose venue and the first building in the UAE to be completed by the Office for Metropolitan Architecture (OMA). In April 2019, Concrete was shortlisted for the 2019 Aga Khan Award for Architecture. Alserkal and the Alserkal family launched Alserkal Arts Foundation in March 2019, to support multi-disciplinary practices across public art commissions, residencies, research grants and educational programmes. Alserkal Advisory was launched in 2021. 

Featured in Surface magazine's 2016 Power 100 list, Abdelmonem serves on the British Museum's Contemporary and Modern Middle Eastern Art Acquisition Group, the Tate's Middle East and North Africa Acquisition Committee, and the Solomon R. Guggenheim Foundation's Middle Eastern Circle.

Alserkal is also a board member of Etisalat Group.

Awards
Alserkal's family have been awarded the Patron of the Arts award twice, in 2012 and 2013, by Sheikh Mohammed Bin Rashid Al Maktoum, Vice President of the UAE and Prime Minister and Ruler of Dubai.

References

Living people
Year of birth missing (living people)
Emirati businesspeople